Easier is a recording studio located in Los Angeles, California and Joshua Tree, California.

Easier was founded in 2007.  The studio has recorded artists: Robert Robinson (Sore Eros), Vudi (American Music Club Swans), Douglas McCarthy (Life Is Sucking The Life Out Of Me aka Kill Your Friends), Eric Erlandson (Contempt To Tape - Letters to Kurt), ESJ3 featuring Jay Rajeck (TRS-80 (group)), Ariel Pink (live and various recordings), Taka Boom, Jason & The Punknecks, Jon Shere & Danny Oxenberg (Supreme Dicks), Tom Surgal, Stephen Papke, Eekie Babaar, Mikie Shioya, Vincent Gallo, Matt Fishbeck (Holy Shit), Holly Cat, Cayal Unger, Kalomo Grimes featuring H.R. of Bad Brains.

Recording studios in California
2007 establishments in California